José Salcedo may refer to:
 José Antonio Salcedo (1816–1864), head of state of the Dominican Republic
 José Luis Salcedo Bastardo (1926–2005), Venezuelan historian and diplomat
 José Salcedo (film editor) (1949–2017), Spanish film editor
 José Salcedo (Chilean footballer) (born 1980), Chilean footballer
 José Antonio Salcedo (footballer) (born 1990), Spanish footballer
 Domingo Salcedo (José Domingo Salcedo González; born 1983), Paraguayan football midfielder

See also 
 José Ulises Macías Salcedo (born 1940), Mexican archbishop of the Archdiocese of Hermosillo
 Juan José de Vértiz y Salcedo (1719–1799), Spanish colonial politician